Andrés Clemente Muñoz (born January 16, 1999) is a Mexican professional baseball pitcher for the Seattle Mariners of Major League Baseball (MLB). He made his MLB debut with the San Diego Padres in 2019.

Career

San Diego Padres
Muñoz signed with the San Diego Padres as an international free agent in July 2015. He made his professional debut in 2016 with the Arizona Padres of the Rookie-level Arizona League, going 1–1 with a 5.49 ERA in 16 games, mostly in relief, averaging 7.3 walks per nine innings. 

In 2017, he played for the Tri-City Dust Devils of the Class A Short Season Northwest League and the Fort Wayne TinCaps of the Class A Midwest League where he was 3–0 with a 3.81 ERA in 24 relief appearances between both teams, averaging 6.2 walks per nine innings.  After the season, he played for the Peoria Javelinas of the Arizona Fall League, where he was the youngest player.

Muñoz started 2018 with Tri-City and was promoted to the San Antonio Missions of the Double-A Texas League during the season. In 24.2 relief innings pitched between the two teams, he was 2–1 with a 0.73 ERA, averaging 4.7 walks per nine innings. 

He began the 2019 season with the Amarillo Sod Poodles of the Double-A Texas League, going 0–2 with a 2.16 ERA and 34 strikeouts over 16.2 innings for them, as he averaged 5.9 walks per nine innings.  On May 21, he was promoted to the El Paso Chihuahuas of the Triple-A Pacific Coast League.   

On July 12, 2019, the Padres selected Muñoz's contract and promoted him to the major leagues. He made his major league debut that night versus the Atlanta Braves, striking out one batter over one inning pitched. He finished with a record of 1–1 in 22 games. He struck out 30 in 23 innings. 

On March 20, 2020, it was announced that Munoz would have to undergo Tommy John surgery and would miss the entire 2020 season.

Seattle Mariners
On August 30, 2020, the Padres traded Muñoz, Ty France, Taylor Trammell, and Luis Torrens to the Seattle Mariners for Austin Nola, Dan Altavilla, and Austin Adams. On February 16, 2021, Muñoz was placed on the injured list as he continued to recover from Tommy John surgery and returned to make an appearance as a reliever in the Mariners last game of the 2021 season. 

On December 1, 2021, Muñoz and the Mariners agreed to a four-year contract extension worth $7.5 million.

References

External links

1999 births
Living people
Mexican expatriate baseball players in the United States
Major League Baseball players from Mexico
Sportspeople from Los Mochis
Baseball players from Sinaloa
Major League Baseball pitchers
San Diego Padres players
Seattle Mariners players
Arizona League Padres players
Tri-City Dust Devils players
Fort Wayne TinCaps players
San Antonio Missions players
Amarillo Sod Poodles players
El Paso Chihuahuas players
Peoria Javelinas players
Arizona Complex League Mariners players
Tacoma Rainiers players